Tomas Kenneth Olsson (March 18, 1976 – May 16, 2006) was a Swedish adventurer and extreme skier. He was born in Kristinehamn but grew up in Borås. He took an engineering degree at Linköping University in 2001, after which he moved to Chamonix in France to focus on skiing. He specialized in skiing down some of the world's highest and steepest mountains. He had gone from the top of Aconcagua in Argentina (6960 m), Lenin Peak in Kyrgyzstan (7134 m), Muztagh Ata (7546 m) and Kuksay Peak (7134 m) in China and Cho Oyu in Tibet (8201 m).

Biography
Tomas Olsson lived in Chamonix in France, where he worked as a professional extreme skier.

Birth and early life
He was born in Kristinehamn and raised in Borås. In high school, he became aware of action sports. By the time of his MSc studies in Linköping, he was devoted to skiing and climbing. After graduating in 2001, he moved to Chamonix to pursue skiing.

Life in Chamonix

Based at Chamonix in the French Alps, Olsson dedicated himself to skiing and climbing. Multiple times a year, he would go to exotic locations to explore new environments and to test his own limits. 
Tomas skied from the summit of Aconcagua (6960m) in Argentina, Peak Lenin (7134m) in Kyrgyzstan, Muztagh Ata (7546m) and Kuksay Peak (7134m) in China, Cho Oyu (8201m) in Tibet, and a volcano in Kamchatka in Siberia. Besides skiing, he had held lectures and worked in product development and promotions with Bergans of Norway and Silva Sweden.

Desire to ski down Everest

Olsson's ultimate goal, which was scheduled for spring 2006, was to once again stand on the summit of Everest. There, he planned that he and Norwegian Tormod Granheim would become the first skiers in the world to ski down Everest's steep north side. At the end of March 2006, he set off to go to Everest.

As training for the Everest expedition in June 2005, he cycled alone from Stockholm to Chamonix, climbed Mont Blanc (4810m), and then rode back to Sweden.

Tomas Olsson was a Swedish adventurer and ski mountaineer who attempted to be the first to make a complete ski descent from the summit of Mount Everest down the Norton Couloir (via North Col), with partner Tormod Granheim, in Spring 2006.

Olsson, Granheim and photographer Fredrik Schenholm approached Everest from the Tibetan side in Spring 2006. Olsson climbed the mountain from Advanced Base Camp, 6400 meters above sea level, to the summit (8848 m) in a 2 days effort. The route he follows known as the Mallory route normally takes climbers five days to complete.

Olsson and Graneheim reached Everest's peak on 16 May 2006. The pair then skied into the North Face by the Norton Couloir, a 55 degree steep and nearly 3000 meter high mountain face. North Col (North Face) Route is one of the most difficult of all the difficult routes to the top of the mountain. On May 16, 2006, after a full day of climbing, the two met up on the mountain and reached the summit. Exhausted, they wondered if they had the strength to ski down. Undeterred by their fatigue, they set off on skis down the North Face via the Norton Couloir at angles as steep as 60 degrees and a sheer 3,000 meter drop. They tried to repair the ski with tape. A cliff intersecting the couloir forced the two to make an abseil. A snow anchor failed and Olsson fell an estimated 2500 meters to his death. Granheim skied alone to the North Col.

Tomas Olsson was not the only one to attempt skiing down Mount Everest this year he was part of "The Vikings are back: Climb + Sky-ski Everest expedition 2006" with the ambition to ski down the North Col route of Mount Everest. As part of an ongoing project to ski the Seven summits, the Swedish expedition were involved in a project of climbing and sky-skiing down the Seven Summits.
The expedition consisted of Tomas Olsson, Tormod Granheim from Norway and Fredrik Schenholm. The guys successfully skied down Cho Oyu in fall, 2004. However, logistical problems prevented the pair from attempting a similar feat on Shisha Pangma. Olsson and Granheim had been training hard all winter in Chamonix, French Alps, for the upcoming Everest challenge. Fredrik Schenholm would join the expedition as a photographer.

Another expedition, Swedish Everest Ski expedition (Martin Letzter and Olof Sundstrom), also skied down Everest the same day as Tomas Olsson using an easier route.

They had already skied Elbrus, Denali, Aconcagua, Kosciuszko, and Kilimanjaro during the last three years. To reach Mount Everest the team reached Tibet after driving 12 000 kilometers from Stockholm to Kathmandu, through such countries as Russia, Poland, Romania, Turkey, Iran, Pakistan and India, in a 13-year-old Land Rover Defender.

The team would have skied the Antarctica the coming winter if they would have been successful in completing their series by skiing Mount Vinson during the Antarctic summer 2006/2007.

During the expedition in May 2006, Olsson, while rappelling down a 150-meter rock cliff at 8,500 meters up, fell to his death when his snow anchor broke, which knocked him unconscious and sent him sliding down the wall to his death, dying the day after David Sharp froze to death in Green Boots Cave.

Mountain skiing
 2002 – Aconcagua – 6962 m
 2002 – Pik Lenin – 7134 m
 2003 – Kuksay Peak – 7186 m
 2003 – Muztagh Ata – 7546 m
 2004 – Cho Oyu – 8201 m
 2006 – Mount Everest – 8848 m

See also

List of people who died climbing Mount Everest
Tormod Granheim
David Sharp, who died the day before Olsson.

References 

SverigesRadio - Boråsare på Mount Everest - tänker åka skidor ner från toppen

1976 births
2006 deaths
Mountaineering deaths on Mount Everest
Swedish summiters of Mount Everest